Frances Muriel T. Waghorn or Robinson (5 June 1950 – January 1994) was an English figure skater who competed at the 1968 Winter Olympics in Grenoble, France. She also appeared at the 1970 World Championships and three European Championships, achieving her best result, 13th, at the 1970 Europeans in Leningrad, Soviet Union.

After retiring from amateur competition, Waghorn performed in Jack and the Beanstalk on Ice (1971) and competed at the 1976 World Professional Championships in Jaca.

Competitive highlights

References 

1950 births
1994 deaths
English female single skaters
Figure skaters at the 1968 Winter Olympics
Olympic figure skaters of Great Britain
Sportspeople from Surrey